While algae growth is a normal part of a lake's ecosystem, excessive blue-green algae blooms are toxic and a hazard to both human and animal ecosystems. They are most often caused by fertilizer run off and sewage, resulting in high concentrations of nitrogen and phosphorus draining into the lake via rivers and surface runoff. In Lake Winnipeg this has been a problem for some time.

Very high levels of the algae toxin microcystin closed Victoria Beach off from the public in the summer of 2003. Grand Beach and other  settlements along the lake are often closed during summer months due to E. coli and algae-toxin related threats. Immense algae blooms have appeared in the northern part of Lake Winnipeg in the last decade covering hundreds of square kilometers. 

In 2006, Lake Winnipeg's algae blooms were considered to be the worst algae problem of any large freshwater lake in the world, according to Canadian Geographic. In 2013, Lake Winnipeg was declared the most threatened lake in the world by the Global Nature Fund, due to excessive level of phosphorus. In 2017, it was reported that less than 1% had been removed.

Social and economic impacts
The lake supports a $100 million a year tourism industry and a $25 million a year fishing industry, and damage to the lake's ecological balance may have adverse economical effects. The toxins that blue-green algae release can destroy fresh water ecosystems and can be dangerous for a wide variety of aquatic and terrestrial species, including humans. It can generate deadly water conditions in prairie dugouts that has killed livestock. Commercial and aboriginal fishermen on the lake often find their nets temporarily disabled during the summer months because of the thick algae conditions.

Lake Winnipeg Research Consortium 
Founded in August 1998, the LWRC set out to gather scientific research data on Lake Winnipeg following the disastrous 1997 Red River flood; evidence showed that the lake was suffering from deteriorating water quality, particularly visible in the lake's chemical, biological, and physical characteristics. As a result of their efforts the LWRC was officially accepted into Manitoba and obtained charitable status in 2008. The LWRC has since partnered with 32 other organizations that represent corporate, government, and university groups. The LWRC strives to promote public awareness and provide educational opportunities with respect to Lake Winnipeg's ecology and environmental issues. Research efforts are conducted on board the LWRC's 33.62 meter long research vessel called the M.V. Namao, which accommodates a nine-person crew and has a cruising speed of twelve knots. The LWRC receives financial support to operate the Namao through Manitoba Hydro, private funding, and the provincial and federal government. The LWRC recently reported that scientific evidence accumulated over the last seventy years now reveals that Lake Winnipeg is approaching a state of deterioration that may affect ecosystem sustainability; significant changes in water transparency, biological species composition, productivity, and sediment chemistry indicate that the lake is on a trajectory of progressive eutrophication.

Watershed and water supply problems 
Lake Winnipeg ranks as the 11th largest lake by surface area; excluding the Caspian Sea, Lake Winnipeg would be the 10th largest freshwater lake in the world. The lake consists of three well-defined regions, the larger North Basin, the smaller South Basin, and the connecting body of water defined as the "Narrows", all of which are greatly affected by algae blooms. The surrounding watershed drainage basin is roughly forty times larger than the lake's surface area. This ratio is higher than any other major lake in the world, making Lake Winnipeg susceptible to excessive nutrient levels. Because Lake Winnipeg holds a considerable small volume of water, the water quality is determined by manmade structures and high nutrient loading.

Eutrophication entry points in Lake Winnipeg include:
 The Winnipeg River (E)
 The Saskatchewan River (W)
 The Red River (S)
 Precipitation
Water outflow points in Lake Winnipeg include:
 The Nelson River (NE)
The Red River accounts for roughly 7,716 tonnes of phosphorus draining into Lake Winnipeg per year. Approximately 2500 tonnes of phosphorus flow out of the lake every year through the Nelson River. It's estimated that number is doubled by incoming phosphorus from agriculture and waste waters from the northern United States. The Saskatchewan River carries phosphorus from Alberta and Saskatchewan into the north-western part of the lake. The Winnipeg River also nutrient loads the lake from Minnesota and Ontario. The nearby City of Winnipeg does not currently remove nitrogen and phosphorus from the majority of its waste water (though upgrades to its sewage treatment plants are currently underway), and these nutrients flow directly into Lake Winnipeg. Due to the washing and filtration techniques used by year-round and seasonal inhabitants along Lake Winnipeg, phosphorus-enriched soapy water can seep into the lake.

Hydro electricity 
A large hydroelectric dam in Grand Rapids, Manitoba, controls the powerful Saskatchewan River. The river currents rapidly catch runoff from much of the Canadian prairies, which then flows through a narrow channel eventually spilling into the north side of Lake Winnipeg. Manitoba Hydro operates numerous dams throughout Manitoba that directly affect Lake Winnipeg's water levels and flow rate. Hydroelectric operations along Lake Winnipeg produce hundreds of millions of dollars in revenue every year for Manitoba Hydro. Pressure from provincial authorities and the media has prompted Manitoba Hydro to donate more than $1.35 million over a six-year span to help researchers tackle the constant biological and water quality changes in Lake Winnipeg.

Chemical and biological problems 

Environment Canada reports that the amount of nitrogen and phosphorus available for plant uptake has increased dramatically in the past several decades. The causes are a massive increase in the use of fertilizer, burning of fossil fuels, development of large urban populations, and an upsurge in land clearing and deforestation. Nitrogen and phosphorus loading from human activity has accelerated eutrophication of certain rivers, lakes, and wetlands in the United States resulting in loss of habitat, changes in biodiversity and, in some cases, loss of recreational potential. Lake Winnipeg suffers from the rapid absorption of the elements phosphorus, nitrogen, and carbon. Eutrophication processes fuel the growth of blue-green algae, also known by its more correct scientific name cyanobacteria. These bacteria normally appear green in color and can turn blue when the algae (bacteria) blooms are dying. As an algae bloom dies, the microscopic cells break down. This process releases toxins in the surrounding water. Once released, some toxins can linger for more than three months until sunlight and the natural population of healthy green algae in the lake degrade them. Cyanobacteria typically thrive off of phosphorus when Lake Winnipeg's summer temperatures are hot and wind speeds are relatively low. Blue-green algae blooms frequently persist for several months in Lake Winnipeg until colder temperatures, currents, and changes in the seasonal weather can filter them out. The cyanobacteria's decomposition process consumes oxygen at such a high rate that this can actually suffocate Lake Winnipeg's native walleye fish species and other aquatic life. Although blue-green algae occurs naturally in Lake Winnipeg, there is no conclusive evidence what normal levels may be. Satellite images show that blooms are occurring more frequently and are covering more surface area of the lake. The Lake Winnipeg algae crisis has grown to such a large scale that the blooms can be seen from outer space.

References 

Lake Winnipeg
Environment of Canada
Algal blooms